St Paul's Church is a historic church in the CBD of Auckland, New Zealand, located on Symonds Street near the University of Auckland and Auckland University of Technology. It is the longest established church in the city and has one of the largest Anglican congregations in Australasia.

The St Paul's foundation stone was laid by Governor William Hobson on 28 July 1841 and the first service was held on 7 May 1843. St Paul's also served as Auckland's Cathedral for over 40 years.  The third and current building was formally consecrated by Bishop William Cowie on 1 November 1895, and is now registered as a Category 1 Historic Place.

History

Early history

Now occupying its third building, St Paul's is known as the 'Mother Church' of Auckland as it is the oldest church community in the city and was founded within a year of the foundation of the city. The first St Paul's was built in Emily Place, just off Princes Street, in 1841 where a plaque still marks the site of the beginning of the Christian church in Auckland.

Old St Paul's was in the centre of the young colonial city, on a prominent ridge-top site on Point Britomart, close to the imperial garrison stationed at Fort Britomart, and near the remnants of the old Rangipuke pā where Ngāti Whātua had defended their rohe during the Musket Wars of the 1820s. St Paul's was the seat of the Bishop of New Zealand, the Right Reverend George Selwyn, and Auckland's wealthiest settlers worshipped there. The religion of British royalty, the Anglican faith was closely linked to colonial power. Many of St Paul's artefacts, such as the Bishop's Throne and a large collection of memorials, are connected to this time when Auckland was New Zealand's capital.

Reverend John Churton was the first minister of St Paul's, occupying that role for 12 years. The Churton Memorial was built to his memory, close to the site of the original church building. In 1863 the original building received extensive enlargements which doubled the seating capacity.

During the height of the New Zealand Wars in the 1860s, St Paul's was used as a safe haven for women, children and the elderly; a traditional church role in times of strife. After the war moved south, however, and Auckland expanded geographically, the congregation dwindled as attendees moved to the new suburbs of Epsom and Remuera, and St Matthew's in the City served the suburbs of Freemans Bay and Ponsonby, while the Church of the Holy Sepulchre served opulent Grafton.

Early bicultural history

On 20 March 1840 in the Manukau Harbour area where Ngāti Whātua farmed, paramount chief Apihai Te Kawau, a friend of Samuel Marsden, signed Te Tiriti o Waitangi (the te reo Māori translation of the Treaty of Waitangi).  Ngāti Whātua sought British protection from Ngāpuhi as well as a reciprocal relationship with the Crown and the Church. Soon after signing Te Tiriti, Ngāti Whātua Ōrākei, the primary hapū and landowner in Tāmaki Makaurau, made a tuku (strategic gift) of 3,500 acres (1,400 hectares) of land on the Waitematā Harbour to Governor Hobson to establish his new capital, Auckland. All three St Paul's buildings would be built on this land.

When St Paul's was founded by Governor Hobson on 28 July 1841, hundreds attended the ceremony including Ngāti Whātua chiefs Apihai Te Kawau, Te Keene and a young Pāora Tūhaere, accompanied by over one hundred Māori warriors.

On 19 July 1842, Bishop Selwyn, having learned te reo Māori himself, issued Rev Churton with a curacy license for 'the township of Auckland'. On the official printed license, Selwyn handwrote "Provided also that you shall use due diligence in the study of the language of the Native Inhabitants of New Zealand, and be ready when required to minister to their spiritual wants in like manner as to those of all the other inhabitants of your District without distinction of persons". However, St Paul's first vicar, who was originally sent by the New Zealand Company, was mainly concerned with European settlers, and refused to learn te reo.

Bishop Selwyn opened St Paul's Church over four services on 7 May 1843. He later wrote, "The services began with a native congregation at nine; some of whom having only heard of the opening on Saturday evening, paddled a distance of twelve miles by sea during the night, in order to be present. The greater number were in full European clothing, and took part in the Church service, in a manner which contrasts most strikingly with that of the silent and unkneeling congregations of the English settlers." St Paul's then held four Sunday services weekly, serving both Māori and European congregations, with two services conducted in te reo Māori and two in English.

The 1845–1846 Northern War in and around the Bay of Islands, caused by the difference in understanding between the English language Treaty of Waitangi and te reo Māori Te Tiriti o Waitangi, lead to an expectation that Hone Heke would attack Auckland, and St Paul's was fortified with shutters with loopholes. After hearing rounds of gunfire, the women and children of the town "were put into St Paul’s Church for safety, the one building easily holding the small population then here" and a military guard was posted for the night. The gunfire which caused the unnecessary panic turned out to be "over the body of a chief who had died during the day".

The increasing European population of Auckland put pressure on Māori land and society, straining relations, leading to the city's second Anglican church, St Barnabas being opened in 1849 specifically for Māori.

St Paul's was the pro-cathedral of Bishop of New Zealand for Selwyn's entire 28 year tenure. The New Zealand Church Missionary Society (CMS) criticised Selwyn for being ineffective in training and ordaining clergy – especially Māori. It took him 11 years to ordain the first Māori Anglican minister, Rev Rota Waitoa, at St Paul’s on 22 May 1853, and 24 years to ordain a Māori priest. Selwyn went on to ordain seven more Māori clergy at St Paul's, but his high church ways were blamed for undermining the work of the CMS and damaging Māori enthusiasm for Christianity.

When Churton died in 1853, Selwyn appointed Rev John Frederick Lloyd to replace him. Lloyd was the opposite of Churton – a personal friend of Selwyn with respect for Māori, who spoke te reo, and had tutored mixed Māori and European classes at St John's College. Together they tried to create a bicultural house of worship.

By 1859, Ngāti Whātua Ōrākei, who had given two further land tuku (strategic gifts) of 13,200 acres (5,342 hectares) to the Crown, had lost most of their remaining land through speculators. The 700-acre Ōrākei block was all that remained. Within a century, this too was compulsorily acquired by the Crown (apart from a cemetery).

Selwyn and Lloyd generally advocated for Māori rights and were often critics of the unjust and reckless land acquisition practices that led to the New Zealand Wars. However, their support of the Invasion of the Waikato as chaplains, damaged their and the church's relationship with Māori, which is still felt today.

Old St Paul's was considered a garrison church, but when the first regimental colours unfurled in New Zealand were donated to the church, Lloyd turned them down so "no jealousies of race or feelings of hostility should ever be permitted to enter, but where men should remember only that they are one in Christ".

When the first St Paul's building was demolished, various political, military, clergy and settler memorials were kept, but the only direct reference to Māori was a plaque mentioning the 'hostile Maoris at Rangariri [sic]'.

Changing locations

The original Emily Place church was demolished in 1885, when Point Britomart was quarried away.

A temporary wooden church, designed by William Skinner, was built on the corner of Short Street and Eden Crescent while a permanent church site was identified. That temporary church is now the Tātai Hono marae, part of the Church of the Holy Sepulchre.

Only the present site, halfway up the Symonds Street hill on the same ridge as the original church, was considered large and central enough for the planned church. It also placed it near Auckland's oldest street, Karangahape Road, which by the 1880s was a thriving thoroughfare and shopping precinct for both Māori and Pākehā. The road was a traditional walking track along the ridge from Ōwairaka (Mt Albert) to Ōrākei for Ngāti Whātua. The official municipal burial ground; the Symonds Street Cemetery was also nearby, on the corner of K’Road and Symonds Street.

The new church building was dedicated in 1894, without the corner tower and steeple that were part of Skinner's design. The Long Depression had inhibited building such a monumental church. The interior was kept plain, apart from the rose window temporarily filled with coloured cathedral glass and the artefacts gifted by Selwyn.

20th century

The appointment of Reverend Cecil Watson in 1908 led to St Paul's being revitalised as a stronghold of Anglo-Catholicism in a largely puritanical city. Watson, and his successor Samuel Corbin shaped the church for a half-century, introducing Sung Mass, choral music and the concept of spiritual healing, which received some resistance.

In 1936 the temporary wooden chancel was replaced with today's concrete chancel, that is yet to be faced in stone.

In 1954 Father Kenneth Prebble inherited a building and congregation both in a poor state, and for the next 20 years he reestablished St Paul's as a centre of Anglo-Catholicism. In the mid-1960s Prebble looked beyond the norm in terms of high church Anglican practise and embraced a revival of the Holy Spirit. Polarising the congregation, St Paul's became Spirit-focused, evangelical and contemporary while maintaining its Anglo-Catholic theology. Through its popular music, and a regular coffee-shop outreach to students and young people, Prebble and his successor Father David Balfour, helped create a church with city-wide and international impact through the 50s and 60s.

From 1956 to 1973 many repairs and additions were made to the building, including: cleaning, repairing and replacing stonework; replacing the roof; and the addition of the Endean Memorial, Christ in Glory and Patteson Memorial stained glass windows.

In 1974 the St Paul's Outreach Trust was formed and by the end of 1976 had produced three records sung by the St Paul's Singers entitled Songs for Prayer & Praise, Arise my Love and Harvest of Joy, plus songbooks including New Glory. However, in the 1970s, the Anglo-Catholicism that had provided the theological framework for the spiritual and social justice revival of the 50s and 60s at St Paul's "dissolved into a bundle of conflicting theologies without strong leadership or good biblical teaching".

During the 1980s and 1990s the parish, with the help of its first Māori curate Wally Te Ua, took steps towards a "more significant understanding of biculturalism" and a Friday night gospel service was established which became an outreach to immigrant families and students from Asian countries. The parish also continued taking an active role in supporting women clergy. However, many congregants of the previous period moved away, and only a "tiny remnant" of Anglo-Catholics remained loyal to the church. In 2002 the parish roll had 46 members.

21st century

During the late 1990s and early 2000s, many young New Zealanders became Christians or renewed their faith at St Mary's London. Returning home, they wanted a similar church in Auckland. With the blessing of the Bishop of Auckland, a team from St Mary's were invited in 2004 to set up new family and young people-focused services at St Paul's, Symonds Street. Reverend Mike and Bex Norris and a core group of about 80 people whom had previously attended St Mary's in London, oversaw huge growth, with 1,335 members on the parish roll by 2009.

From 2009 to 2013, St Paul's produced the GLOW Carols by Glowstick event at Auckland's Vector Arena, with around 10,000 people attending each year. A key part of the event were Christmas films produced by St Paul's including The Christmas Story which has had 4 million views on YouTube. The 2012 documentary short film O Little Town of Bethlehem was shot in modern Bethlehem. In 2012 St Paul's produced its debut live worship album titled GOD w/ US including the voices of around 800 worshippers gathered across three services.

In 2013 St Paul's priest in charge Reverend Mathew Newton officially asked the Anglican Diocese of Auckland synod to divest from fossil fuel industries due to the threat of climate change. It agreed and became the first New Zealand institutional body to do so.

In 2015 St Paul's published a hard cover book of personal testimonies and photos of 128 children, youth and adults from the church called Stories.

From 2015 to 2019, St Paul's produced Alt Carols as an alternative Christmas experience, combining creative elements of music, art and design. Volume One of the remixed carols from the events was released as an album in 2017, Volume Two in 2019.

From 2019 to 2022, St Paul's Restoration leader Esther Grant, heritage & conservation architects Salmond Reed Architects and structural & seismic engineers worked to repair, strengthen and refresh the church building. Seismic strengthening was needed to reach building standards changed after the 2011 Christchurch earthquake. On 5 March 2020, Ngāti Whātua Ōrākei led a blessing for the work, and St Paul's thanked the descendants of Apihai Te Kawau for the gift of the land on which the church was built. Huge timelines telling the stories of Ngāti Whātua Ōrākei and St Paul's were installed side by side on the scaffold hoardings during the Phase 2 work that was completed in 2020. Future work planned includes renewing the main roof with slate, further increasing seismic strength, restoring the interior, installing stained glass in the clerestory and building the spire.

In 2020, Reverend Dr Nathan McLellan was ordained as a priest into the tikanga Māori Te Pīhopatanga o Te Tai Tokerau and, uniquely, was then licensed by Bishop Ross Bay to minister at St Paul’s, which is a part of the tikanga pākehā Auckland Anglican Diocese.

Due to government and diocese restrictions during the 2020 to 2022 COVID-19 pandemic, for a total 52 weeks St Paul's replaced services and events in its buildings with 400 pre-recorded and live online videos that received a total of 436,700 views, including its first online-only Christmas services in 2021.

St Paul's has a staff of 20 which includes a priest in charge, three assistant priests, a worship leader, six other full time employees, four part time office employees, five additional Sunday workers and one contractor. The parish is currently searching for a new vicar.

Discography

St Paul's Singers 
 Songs for Prayer & Praise, album (1974)
 Arise my Love, album (1974)
 Harvest of Joy, album (1975)
 New Harvest, album (1981)

St Paul's Music 
 GOD w/ US, live album (2012)
 Creation's King, single (2014)
 Alt Carols, compilation EP (2016)
 Alt Carols, Vol. 1, compilation album (2017)
 Alt Carols, Vol. 1.5, compilation EP (2018)
 Alt Carols, Vol. 2, compilation album (2019)
 See Again (Bartimaeus), single (2020)
 You Are My Desire, single (2022)

Bibliography

St Paul's Outreach Trust 
 Arise my Love – song book (1974)
 Harvest of Praise (1975)
 New Glory – songs of renewal (1976)
 New Harvest (1980)
 To God be the Glory – the first 10½ years of the charismatic renewal in St Paul's (1981)
 A Brief History of St Paul's Symonds Street (1991)

St Paul's 
 St Paul's Stories (2015)

Videography

SPAM (St Paul's Arts & Media) 
 The Christmas Prophecy (2006)
 Google Earth Christmas (2006)
 Open (2007)
 The Open Post 1&2 (2007)
 Open – Alice (2007)
 Family – An Exploration (2007)
 The Big Little Easter Story 1&2 (2009)
 O Little Town of Bethlehem (2012)
 766 Christmases (2013)
 Star of Wonder (2016)
 Gold Frankincense Myrrh (2017)
 Stained Historical Stories – Talks 1–4 (2018)
 This is Christmas (2019)
 Palm Sunday Reading (2020)
 Easter Sunday Reading (2020)
 Christmas, I Choose to Remember (2020)
 Common Christmas Questions (2020)
 The Stories of Advent 1–6 (2021)
 Jesus Meets His Mother (2022)

St Paul's 
 Life (2007)
 How We're Doing It (2009)
 Life Questions (2011)
 GLOW Event Opening (2011)
 Date My Mate NZ (2012)
 International Students (2013)
 Life Course (2013)
 Mike & Bex 10 Years (2013)
 Twins and Twins (2014)
 GLOW Promo (2014)
 Visual Identity (2018)
 Big Issues (2020)
 Restoration Update (2020)
 The Story of St Paul's (so far ...) (2021)
 The Open Course (2021)
 The Evening Service (2022)
 400 pre-recorded and live online service, prayer, youth and kids videos, during COVID-19 restrictions (2020–21)

SPANK (St Paul's Arts 'n' Kids) 
 When God Was Born (2008)
 Boys (2009)
 The Christmas Story (2010)
 Good News of Great Joy (2011)
 My Mum (20012)
 An Unexpected Christmas (2012)
 Star News Bethlehem (2013)
 The Story of the Whole Bible (2019)

St Paul's Music 
 GOD w/ US 1–14 (2012, 2014)
 Creation's King (2014)
 Alt Carols 1–5 (2016)
 See Again (Bartimaeus) 1&2 (2020)
 You Are My Desire (2022)

Gallery

Windows gallery

List of vicars

References

External links 

 

Anglican churches in New Zealand
Paul's Church
Heritage New Zealand Category 1 historic places in the Auckland Region
Listed churches in New Zealand
Anglo-Catholic churches in New Zealand
1890s architecture in New Zealand
Gothic Revival church buildings in New Zealand
Religious organizations established in 1841
Churches completed in 1894
Auckland CBD
Stone churches in New Zealand